Matthew William Magill (born November 10, 1989) is an American former professional baseball pitcher. He played in Major League Baseball for the Los Angeles Dodgers, Cincinnati Reds, Minnesota Twins, and Seattle Mariners.

Professional career

Los Angeles Dodgers
Magill was drafted by the Dodgers in the 31st round of the 2008 MLB Draft out of Royal High School in Simi Valley, California. He played with the Gulf Coast Dodgers in 2008, Ogden Raptors in 2009, Great Lakes Loons in 2010 and Rancho Cucamonga Quakes in 2011. With the AA Chattanooga Lookouts in 2012 he was 11-8 with a 3.76 ERA and was selected to the Southern League midseason All-Star team. The Dodgers added him to the 40 man roster after the season and promoted him to the AAA Albuquerque Isotopes to start 2013.

He was called up to the Majors for the first time on April 27, 2013 to start against the Milwaukee Brewers. He pitched 6.2 innings while allowing two runs and striking out seven. Magill made 3 more starts with the Dodgers before he was optioned back to Triple-A Albuquerque on May 20. He had no record and a 5.00 ERA in his 4 starts.  Magill was recalled again to make an emergency start in place of Hyun-Jin Ryu on June 2. 
Magill spent the entire 2014 season with the Isotopes, where he worked as both a starter and a reliever. He was in 36 games and started 12 of them. He was 7-6 with a 5.21 ERA.

Cincinnati Reds
On December 2, 2014, Magill was traded to the Cincinnati Reds for outfielder Chris Heisey. He underwent Tommy John surgery in May, ending his season and was released by the Reds in June.

San Diego Padres
On January 30, 2017, Magill signed a minor league contract with the San Diego Padres. He elected free agency on November 6, 2017.

Minnesota Twins
On January 24, 2018, Magill signed a minor league contract with the Minnesota Twins. His contract was selected by the Twins on April 28. Magill spent the remainder of the season pitching out of the bullpen, appearing in 40 games. He struck out 56 in  innings. He went 2–0 with a 4.45 ERA in 28 innings for the Twins in 2019, before being designated for assignment on July 21.

Seattle Mariners
On July 21, 2019, Magill was traded to the Seattle Mariners in exchange for cash considerations. In 22 games, Magill was 3-2 with 28 strikeouts in  innings. Magill began the 2020 season with a 6.10 ERA with 11 strikeouts in 10.1 innings pitched across 11 appearances before being placed on the 10-day injured list with a right shoulder strain on August 28, 2020. He was later shifted to the 60-day injured list. On October 22, 2020, Magill was activated from the 60-day injured list, but was outrighted off of the 40-man roster and elected free agency. On November 5, 2020, Magill re-signed a minor league deal with the Mariners. On March 27, 2021, Magill was released by Seattle. On March 30, the Mariners re-signed Magill to a two-year, minor league contract. Magill did not appear in 2021. 

On February 3, 2022, Magill announced his retirement. Magill later stated on Twitter that his reason for retirement was due to lingering shoulder injuries and that he "couldn't throw without discomfort and pain."

References

External links

1989 births
Living people
People from Simi Valley, California
Sportspeople from Ventura County, California
Baseball players from California
Major League Baseball pitchers
Los Angeles Dodgers players
Cincinnati Reds players
Minnesota Twins players
Seattle Mariners players
Gulf Coast Dodgers players
Ogden Raptors players
Great Lakes Loons players
Rancho Cucamonga Quakes players
Albuquerque Isotopes players
Indios de Mayagüez players
Arizona League Dodgers players
Louisville Bats players
Glendale Desert Dogs players
Pensacola Blue Wahoos players
El Paso Chihuahuas players
Arizona League Padres players
Rochester Red Wings players